Skypemare is a 2013 American viral horror / thriller short film. It was written and directed by John Fitzpatrick, and stars 'scream queen' Cerina Vincent and Annika Marks. The film premiered at the 2013 Telluride Horror Show and followed multiple film festival screenings including Shriekfest and Screamfest. The short premiered online Halloween 2014 and became a viral YouTube short receiving over 1.5 million views. The same production team made a follow-up film Brentwood Strangler released in 2016.

Premise

Alison is left home alone on Halloween night, but while chatting with her best friend Jenna over Skype, something terrifying happens to Jenna, leaving Alison helpless on the other side of the computer screen, watching in horror.

Cast 
 Cerina Vincent as Allison
 Annika Marks as Jenna
 Ryan Dillon as Steve
 Adam J. Yeend as Gary Gray

External links
Official website

References

2013 horror films
2013 films
American horror short films
2010s mystery films
Halloween horror films
2010s English-language films
2010s American films